is a passenger railway station located in the town of Ino, Agawa District, Kōchi Prefecture, Japan. It is operated by JR Shikoku and has the station number "K07".

Lines

In addition to the local trains of the Dosan Line, the following limited express services also stop at Ino Station:

Layout
The station consists of a side platform and an island platform serving three tracks. A waiting room and JR ticket window are located inside the station building which is connected to the platform serving line 1. Ramps and a level crossing give access to the island platform serving lines 2 and 3. A passing siding is located beyond line 3. A bike shed and parking lots are located outside the station.

Adjacent stations

History
At this time the station was operated by Japanese Government Railways, later becoming Japanese National Railways (JNR). With the privatization of JNR on 1 April 1987, control of the station passed to JR Shikoku.

Connections

Surrounding area
Japan National Route 33
Ino Town Hall

See also
 List of Railway Stations in Japan

References

External links

 JR Shikoku timetable

Railway stations in Kōchi Prefecture
Railway stations in Japan opened in 1924
Ino, Kōchi